The Dandong–Fuxin Expressway also part of Asian Highway 1, commonly referred to as the Danfu Expressway is an expressway that connects the cities of Dandong, Liaoning, China, and Fuxin, Liaoning. Dandong is on the border with North Korea, and the Sino–Korean Friendship Bridge provides a border crossing into North Korea. The expressway is a spur of G11 Hegang–Dalian Expressway and is entirely in Liaoning Province.

The final section from Xinmin to Fuxin is in planning.

The expressway connects the following cities, all of which are in Liaoning Province:
 Dandong
 Benxi
 Shenyang
 Xinmin
 Fuxin

Detailed Itinerary

References

Chinese national-level expressways
Expressways in Liaoning